Kumi Taguchi may refer to:

 Kumi Taguchi (journalist) (born 1975), Australian broadcaster and presenter
 Kumi Taguchi (actress), Japanese actress in 1970's films